A list of films produced in the United Kingdom in 1990 (see 1990 in film):

1990

See also
1990 in British music
1990 in British radio
1990 in British television
1990 in the United Kingdom

External links

1990
Films
British